Deer Island is one of the American Thousand Islands. It lies between mainland Canada and United States, within the Saint Lawrence River, in the Town of Alexandria, close to Alexandria Bay, New York. It is owned entirely by the Russell Trust Association and is used as a Skull and Bones retreat.

The island lies near Boldt Castle and can be seen up close from several Canadian and U.S. tour vessels that operate in the local waterways.  The land on the island is densely overgrown, with a small lodge on the southern corner of the island.

Flora and fauna 
The island is covered in indigenous trees, made up of mostly white pine, black oak, hemlock, and sugar maple — typical of the Canadian Shield — as is much of the surrounding area.  There are several abandoned ruins located throughout the  island, now overgrown and barely visible beneath the growth.

References

External links
 Deer Island: A Brief History

Islands of Jefferson County, New York
Islands of the Thousand Islands in New York (state)
Skull and Bones Society